Tugarinovia is a genus of East Asian plants in the tribe Cardueae within the family Asteraceae.

Species
There is only one known species, Tugarinovia mongolica, native to (Outer) Mongolia and Inner Mongolia.

varieties
 Tugarinovia mongolica var. mongolica
 Tugarinovia mongolica var. ovatifolia Ling & Ma

References

Cynareae
Monotypic Asteraceae genera
Flora of Mongolia
Flora of Inner Mongolia